Trud is a village in Southern Bulgaria, located in Maritsa Municipality, Plovdiv Province. The total population count as of the June 2020 Census is 4017 people.

Geography 
Trud village is in the Upper Thracian Plain, 11 kilometers North from the city of Plovdiv. The average elevation of the village is 175 meters above sea level. The total land mass are of the village is 3965 ha.

There are several natural landmarks around Trud. There is a century-old tree of an age over 300 years. The tree bares the name of "Arnautski Dub".

Landmarks 
Six mounds form the area "Dense Mounds" near the village. In the proximity there are 9 mounds more, none of which has been excavated for archeological purposes.

Necropolises have been discovered North West, South East and South from the current location of the village. A Thracian temple was discovered in the North West part of Trud. Tablets were found with the faces of heroes and the god Apollo.

Byzantine coins from the 5th and 6th century have also been discovered in the whereabouts of the village. The majority of the finds can be seen in the Archeological Museum of Plovdiv

History and culture 
During the 4th century, a Thracian settlement is established near the village. It originally bore the name Sgulame.

Infrastructure 

 School – "Sv. Sv Kiril i Metodii" – was built during 1878, after the liberation of Bulgaria from Ottoman Rule.
 Church "Sv. Troitsa" was built in 1869 by Mincho Stari.
 Community Hall and Library "Svetlina" – built in 1929

Gallery

References 

Villages in Plovdiv Province
Villages in Maritsa Municipality